The Club Kids were a group of young New York City dance club personalities popularized by Michael Alig, James St. James, Julie Jewels, Astro Erle, Michael Tronn, DJ Keoki, and Ernie Glam in the late 1980s, and throughout the 1990s would grow to include Amanda Lepore, Waltpaper (Walt Cassidy), Christopher Comp, It Twins, Jennytalia (Jenny Dembrow), Desi Monster (Desi Santiago), Keda, Kabuki Starshine, and Richie Rich. The group was notable for its members' flamboyant behavior and outrageous costumes. In 1988, writer Michael Musto wrote about the Club Kids' "cult of crazy fashion and petulance": "They ... are terminally superficial, have dubious aesthetic values, and are master manipulators, exploiters, and, thank God, partiers."

The group was also recognized as an artistic and fashion-conscious youth culture. They were a definitive force in New York City's underground club culture at the time. Several Club Kids have made long-lasting contributions to mainstream art and fashion. According to former Club Kid Waltpaper, "The nightclub for me was like a laboratory, a place where you were encouraged and rewarded for experimentation." However, Alig was plagued by heavy drug use. He began adding drug dealers to the Club Kids roster and Peter Gatien's payroll, and increasing numbers of Club Kids became addicted to drugs.

The movement began to decline when Rudy Giuliani took office as mayor of New York in 1994, targeting the city's nightlife industry with his Quality of Life campaign. It eventually collapsed after Alig was arrested for the killing and dismemberment of his roommate and fellow club kid Andre "Angel" Melendez, and Peter Gatien was charged with tax evasion and deported to Canada.

Members 
The group, which Alig estimates included up to "750 in the early 90s at different levels", consisted of Michael Alig; Julie Jewels and Michael Tronn (among others), who helped organize the early Outlaw Parties; and Alig's mentor/friend/rival James St. James (born James Clark). Others were the following:

 Astro Earl (also styled "Astro Erle")
 Susanne Bartsch
 Christina Superstar
 Christopher Comp
 Screamin Rachael Cain
 Clara the Carefree Chicken, the mascot of Alig's weekly Disco 2000 parties
 Dan Dan the Naked Man
 David Alphabet
 Desi Monster (Desi Santiago)
 Lisa E (Lisa Edelstein)
 Ernie Glam (Ernie Garcia)
 Ernie the Pee Drinker
 Patricia Field
 George the Pee Drinker
 Girlina (Lina Bradford, also known as DJ Lina)
 Gitsie (or Gitsey, Cynthia Haataja)
 Goldy Loxxx
 Brooke Humphries
 Ida Slapter
 Jenny Talia (also styled "JennyTalia" or "Genetalia", née Jenny Dembrow)
 Julie Jewels
 Julius Teaser
 Junkie Jonathan (also known as "Jonathan Junkie")
 Kabuki
 Kenny Kenny, the group's door person
 Keoki (also known as "Superstar DJ Keoki", born Keoni Franconi)
 Lady Bunny (born Jon Ingle)
 Lahoma van Zant (Jon Witherspoon)
 Lina Beltre, actress, dancer, poet & producer
 Sophia Lamar
 Larry Tee
 Amanda Lepore
 Karliin Mann
 Mavis
 Apollo Braun
 Andre "Angel" Melendez
 Richie Rich
 Robert "Freeze" Riggs
 RuPaul
 Sacred Boy
 Thairin Smothers
 The It Twins (Robert and Tim)
 Michael Tronn
 Michael T 
 Tobell von Cartier
 Waltpaper (Walt Cassidy)
 Zaldy

Prominent chroniclers of the club kids culture 

 Waltpaper, club kid and author of New York: Club Kids by Waltpaper
 Michael Musto, Village Voice columnist and partygoer alongside the Club Kids
 James St. James, author of Disco Bloodbath: A Fabulous but True Tale of Murder in Clubland, a 1999 memoir of James' life as a Manhattan club kid, as well as Michael Alig's murder of Andre "Angel" Melendez. The memoir was retitled Party Monster after the 2003 movie that starred Macaulay Culkin, Seth Green, Chloë Sevigny, and Marilyn Manson.
 Nelson Sullivan, videographer and host of cultural gatherings and events
 Ernie Glam, Michael Alig, creators and hosts of the YouTube Channel show "Peeew!" which featured interviews of Club Kids and the history of the Club Kids.

History 
Alig moved to New York City from his hometown—South Bend, Indiana—in 1984 and began hosting small events. In 1987, he supplanted Andy Warhol as a leading New York partier; in an article in Interview, Alig said: "We were all going to become Warhol Superstars and move into The Factory. The funny thing was that everybody had the same idea: not to dress up but to make fun of people who dressed up. We changed our names like they did, and we dressed up in outrageously crazy outfits in order to be a satire of them—only we ended up becoming what we were satirizing."

The Club Kids' aesthetic emphasized outrageousness, "fabulousness", and sex. Gender was fluid, and everything was DIY. In Musto's words: "It was a statement of individuality and sexuality which ran the gamut, and it was a form of tapping into an inner fabulousness within themselves and bringing it out."

As the group's influence grew, they spread from the back rooms of lesser-known clubs to venues such as Area, Rudolf Piper's Danceteria, and the Palladium. From there, Alig and his gang went on to run Peter Gatien's club network, including Club USA, Palladium, Tunnel, and The Limelight. To draw crowds into these venues, Alig and the Club Kids began holding guerilla-style "outlaw parties", where, fully costumed and ready to party, they would hijack locations like Burger King, Dunkin' Donuts, McDonald's, ATM vestibules, the old High Line tracks before their conversion to a park, and the New York City Subway blasting music from a boombox and dancing until the police cleared them out. Alig even "threw a party in a cardboard shantytown rented from its homeless inhabitants", whom he paid with cash and crack cocaine. 

He ensured that such events always happened in the vicinity of an actual club to which the group could decamp. At the height of their cultural popularity, the Club Kids toured the United States (throwing parties, "certifying" those clubs for inclusion in the Club Kids network, and recruiting new members), and appeared on several talk shows, including Geraldo, The Joan Rivers Show, and the Phil Donahue Show.

As the 1990s began, the front line of the Club Kids became occupied by a younger group of dynamic personalities that were discovered and mentored by Alig, such as Waltpaper, Jennytalia (Jenny Dembrow), Desi Monster (Desi Santiago), Astro Erle, Christopher Comp, Pebbles, Keda, Kabuki Starshine, Sacred Boy, Sushi, Lil Keni, DJ Whillyem, Aphrodita, Lila Wolfe and Richie Rich. Many of these primary Club Kids lived together communally in large triplex apartments, and at the Chelsea Hotel and Hotel 17.

Prominent music personalities, such as Bjork, then singer of the band Sugarcubes, were seen hanging with the Club Kids. With Techno and the incoming rave scene, fashion began to soften into an ambiguous gender-fluid style, which melded references to the Club Kids with skate, indie, hip-hop, and grunge. Brands began casting street models and club personalities in shows, campaigns and music videos. Actress Chloë Sevigny emerged from the group at this time, and frequently modeled with Waltpaper, Jennytalia, DJ Whillyem, and Karliin Mann for brands like JYSP Johnson, Calvin Klein, and Jean-Paul Gaultier and in various editorials that showcased Rave vs. Club Kid style for magazines, including Paper, Max, Project X, Interview, Details and High Times.

The movement's decline was marked by an event on Sunday, March 17, 1996, when Alig and his roommate Robert "Freeze" Riggs killed former Limelight employee and reputed drug dealer Andre "Angel" Melendez. After nine months, Alig and Riggs were arrested. The group dissipated in the mid-1990s after Mayor Rudy Giuliani's "Quality of Life" crackdown on Manhattan's nightclubs.

Many of the members of the Club Kids distanced themselves from Alig as details of the murder were released and branded by the press and through documentaries such as Party Monster. Waltpaper stated in Interview: "I would say a lot of the community felt our experience of the time was hijacked by that Party Monster narrative...That's not the New York I knew. That narrative doesn't include the creativity, vibrancy, and cultural impact that I experienced." For his 2019 book, New York: Club Kids, Cassidy weaves an optimistic narrative where a bunch of misfits made a wonderland by being themselves.

Depictions in art, entertainment, and media

Books 
 The events of Michael Alig's years as a club promoter up to his arrest are covered in James St. James's memoir Disco Bloodbath: A Fabulous but True Tale of Murder in Clubland (1999), re-released with the title Party Monster after the release of the eponymous 2003 film.
 A visual diary of New York City in the 1990s, New York: Club Kids by Waltpaper (published by Damiani, 2019) is a visual document of the nightlife and street culture.

Films 
 The documentary film Party Monster: The Shockumentary (1998) and the feature film Party Monster (2003) – both directed by former Club Kids Fenton Bailey and Randy Barbat, and focused on the murder of Melendez by Alig and Riggs – are based upon St. James' memoir.
 A prison interview with Alig is featured in the documentary Limelight (2011), directed by Billy Corben and produced by Peter Gatien's daughter Jen Gatien .
 The documentary film Glory Daze: The Life and Times of Michael Alig (2015) reviews the creation, rise, and dispersion of the Club Kids phenomenon and the life of Michael Alig, including his return to New York City after serving a 17-year prison sentence for murdering Andre "Angel" Melendez.

Music 
Ernie Glam and Jason Jay wrote  "Party Clothes". It was released on the one year anniversary of Michael Alig's death.
Later Ernie Glam and Jason Jay wrote  "Fashion " and released it on May 21, 2022.

Greg Tanoose wrote and produced the song "What's In" with Michael Alig and DJ Keoki. It has Michael Alig on vocals.
 Alig and Melendez's friend Screamin Rachael wrote the song "Give Me My Freedom/Murder in Clubland" after Alig and Gitsie took a road trip to visit her in Denver, arriving five weeks after Melendez's "disappearance". The lyrics to a backwards loop in the song include lines "Michael, where's Angel?" and "Did someone just cry wolf, or is he dead?"

Television 
Melendez's murder case was featured on the TV series:
 American Justice: "Dancing, Drugs, and Murder" (2000) on A&E
 Deadly Devotion: "Becoming Angel" (July 16, 2013) on Investigation Discovery
 Notorious
 RuPaul's Drag Race: season nine, episode nine, titled "Your Pilot's on Fire", had a club kid theme on the runway.
 Saturday Night Live character Stefon (Bill Hader) is a parody of a stereotypical club kid; he and co-creator John Mulaney took inspiration from Party Monster in creating him.

Theatre 
 Clubland: The Monster Pop Party (2013), a musical adaptation of St. James' book Party Monster and its 2003 eponymous film adaptation, debuted April 11, 2013 at the American Repertory Theater's Club Oberon, with book, music, and lyrics by Andrew Barret Cox

See also 

 Blitz Kids
 Leigh Bowery
 New Romanticism
 Romo
 Raves
 Zippies

References

Bibliography

External links 
  at michaelaligclubkids.com

 
LGBT history in New York City
Nightlife in New York City
Subcultures